Blind Pilot is an American indie folk band based in Portland, Oregon, United States. They have released three albums and one EP since 2008.

History
On July 15, 2008, Blind Pilot released their debut CD 3 Rounds and a Sound on Expunged Records. "Go On, Say It", was chosen to be a Single of the Week on July 7, 2008 on the iTunes chart, and for the week of July 26 the record reached number 13 on the Billboard Top Digital Albums chart. Allmusic gave the album 3.5/5 stars.

Originally a duo between Israel Nebeker and Ryan Dobrowski, the band added four touring members in February 2009. On December 29 of that year, the band released an iTunes only live EP. This EP featured a cover of Gillian Welch's "Look at Miss Ohio". The EP also included new versions of previously released songs, along with a new song, titled "Get It Out". The EP was mixed and recorded by Tucker Martine.

Blind Pilot released their second album, We Are The Tide, on September 13, 2011 as a sextet. The album featured the song "Get It Out" from the previous EP. Allmusic praised the additional members, who they said "add bigger, brighter colors to the mix" in a 4.5-star review.

On June 1, 2016, Blind Pilot announced their third album, And Then Like Lions, would be released August 12 on ATO Records. The album received 'universal acclaim' from Metacritic, with a score of 71 out of 100 from critics.

Origin of the band name 
During a 2009 interview with LAist, Israel describes how the original duo came up with the name:A blind pilot is one of the scariest things I can think of. Why did you choose that name? When Ryan and I came up with the name in Astoria, when we were planning our first bike tour. It seemed fitting for what we were trying to do. We hadn't heard of anyone else who had done it and we hadn't booked that many shows. It was as if we were flying into the unknown. We couldn't see what's going to happen.

Performance and touring history
The band completed a bicycle tour in 2008, biking from Bellingham, Washington to San Diego, California, carrying their instruments on custom bicycle trailers they fashioned themselves. They made more than two dozen stops along the way, including Port Townsend, Seattle, Olympia, Portland, Corvallis, Eugene, Coos Bay, Arcata and Santa Cruz.

Touring for their debut album continued in 2009. On February 12, Blind Pilot made their network television debut on Last Call with Carson Daly. In May, they played at the Sasquatch! Music Festival at the Gorge Amphitheatre in George, Washington, and in August they played at Lollapalooza in Chicago and Outside Lands in San Francisco.

To promote We Are The Tide on January 6, 2012, the band made their second network television appearance on the Late Show with David Letterman, in which Letterman initially introduced the band as "Blind Spot" before correcting himself and poking fun at the gaffe. Subsequent touring for the album included a performance at the Bonnaroo Music Festival in Manchester, Tennessee on June 9, as well as returns to Lollapalooza and Sasquatch. Their song "Half Moon" was performed on Ellen during the host's birthday episode on January 25, 2013.
Blind Pilot's music has been featured in some television programs, including Chuck, One Tree Hill, Californication, and Private Practice.

The band finished their tour with Vance Joy on December 3, 2016. Their most recent tour with Bad Bad Habits, Anna Tivel, and Gregory Alan Isakov ran from 2017 to mid-2018. As of late 2018 the band is working on writing and recording their fourth studio album.

Band members
 Israel Nebeker – vocals, guitar
 Ryan Dobrowski – drums, percussion
 Luke Ydstie – upright bass, bass guitar, backing vocals 
 Kati Claborn – banjo, mountain dulcimer, ukulele, banjo ukulele, guitar, bass guitar, additional percussion, backing vocals
 Dave Jorgensen – trumpet, keyboards
 Ian Krist – vibraphone, additional percussion

Discography

Albums

Drummer Ryan Dobrowski did the artwork for both 3 Rounds and a Sound and We Are the Tide.

EPs

Singles

Notes

References

External links
 
 Blind Pilot on YouTube

People from Astoria, Oregon
Musical groups from Portland, Oregon
Indie pop groups from Oregon
Indie rock musical groups from Oregon
Cycling in Oregon
2005 establishments in Oregon
Musical groups established in 2005
American indie folk groups